Tadair was an airline based in Barcelona, Catalonia, Spain.

History
Tadair was established in 1990 and operated general aviation aircraft associated with its flying school as well as regional charter services.

The company had a number of fatal accidents during its history. On 12 April 2002 there was an accident at Palma de Mallorca Airport involving Tadair's Fairchild Metro II that resulted in two casualties.

Tadair filed for bankruptcy in 2003. At the moment of ceasing operations it had only one Fairchild Metro II aircraft. Following the bankruptcy of the company numerous lawsuits were filed by creditors against the successor company Speed Fly SL.

Fleet 
The Tadair fleet consisted of 19 aircraft in 1998. 
 10 Fairchild Metro II 
 9 Piper PA-31 Navajo

References

External links

Cementerio de aviones en el Aeropuerto de Sabadell

Defunct airlines of Spain
Airlines established in 1990
Airlines disestablished in 2003
1990 establishments in Catalonia
Spanish companies established in 1990
Spanish companies disestablished in 2003